Balamangalam was a Malayalam comic magazine published between 1980 and 2012. It was also published in Kannada with the title Balamangala.

History and profile 
Balamangalam was first published in 1980. The publisher was Mangalam Publications (India) Private Limited. The fortnightly magazine featured, along with the comic strips, children's stories, rhymes and puzzles. Its target audience was children. The headquarters of the fortnightly was in Kottayam.

In October 2012, Mangalam Publications, the owners of Balamangalam announced that they would stop publication due to poor sales. The news created an outcry on social media websites and prompted the publishers to clarify that "the closure is just temporary and Balamangalam may return soon." Still, the magazine remained closed.

Main stories 
 Dinkan (Artist: Baby)
 Saktimarunnu (Story: Manu, Artist: Baby)

Kannada language 

Balamangala was the Kannada language edition of Balamangalam, and circulated in Karnataka, India.

Along with comic strips, the magazine featured children's stories, rhymes, puzzles and crosswords, including the fictional characters Dinga, Shaktimaddu, Kaadina Kitta, Keraga, Pingala, Karingaada, Tuttu, Chenchu, Tiko, Chomu, Thangu Maama, Onti Salaga, and Chippu Delu.

Harsha, a 15-year-old boy's first short story, "Mola Matthu Nari" (meaning: Rabbit and Fox) was published in the magazine.

Publisher 

Balamangala Kannada(RNI:44741/1989) was published by Mangalam Publication (India) Pvt. Ltd. located in Kottayam, Kerala.

Dinkoism 

Based on the magazine's fictional character, Dinga (Malayalam: Dinkan), a parody religion and a social movement called Dinkoism emerged and evolved on social networks organized by independent welfare groups in Kerala, India.

See also 
 List of Kannada-language magazines
 List of Malayalam-language periodicals
 Media in Kerala
 Media in Karnataka
 Media of India

References

External links 
 Official website

1980 establishments in Kerala
2012 disestablishments in India
Defunct magazines published in India
Biweekly magazines published in India
Children's magazines published in India
Magazines about comics
Magazines established in 1980
Magazines disestablished in 2012
Malayalam comics
Malayalam-language magazines
Mass media in Kerala
Kannada-language magazines
Mass media in Karnataka